Ackerly is a surname. Notable people with the surname include:

Brooke Ackerly, American political scientist
Charles Ackerly (1898–1982), American wrestler
David Ackerly (born 1960), Australian rules footballer

See also
 Acker